Chandiyawas is a village in Ajmer tehsil of Ajmer district of Rajasthan state in India. The village falls under Gegal gram panchayat.

Demography 
As per 2011 census of India, Chandiyawas has population of 798 of which 409 are males and 389 are females. Sex ratio of the village is 951.

Transportation
Chandiyawas is connected by air (Kishangarh Airport), by train (Madar railway station) and by road.

See also
Ajmer Tehsil
Madar railway station

References

Villages in Ajmer district